The Protyre 2011 Formula Renault BARC season was the 17th Formula Renault BARC Championship. The BARC is the British Automobile Racing Club (BARC) that is one of the biggest organising clubs for auto racing in the United Kingdom. The season began at Donington Park on 23 April and ended on 16 October at Silverstone, after twelve rounds held in England.

Teams and drivers

Calendar
The series will form part of the BARC club racing meetings. The final round at Silverstone will be part of the British Touring Car Championship meeting. On 3 March, a non-championship round was announced, to be held at Zandvoort, supporting the Masters of Formula 3 event and racing alongside the Formula Renault 2.0 Northern European Cup. Only Hillspeed took cars to the event. All rounds held in United Kingdom

Championship standings

References

External links
 The official website of the Formula Renault BARC Championship

BARC
Formula Renault BARC season
Renault BARC